D-Force, known in Japan as , is a 1991 vertical scrolling shooter video game developed and published in Japan by Asmik for the Super Famicom and later localized and published in North America by Asmik Corporation of America for the Super NES. It involves an Apache helicopter set on defeating an evil Middle Eastern dictator. There are seven levels which feature six countries. Some of the levels involve switching altitudes in order to attack enemies from a different height, which uses Mode 7, one of the main features of the Super NES.

Gameplay
The main menu splits the game up into three sections; "Game Start," "Shooting Mode," and "Exploration Mode."

Game Start plays through all of the game's seven levels. Shooting Mode plays only the first, third, and fifth levels where consistent shooting and dodging enemy fire is the main focus. These levels are also the only levels that feature the ability to gain bullet and missile power-ups to the helicopter. "Exploration Mode" plays only the second, fourth, and sixth levels which involve switching altitudes to shoot down certain enemies and avoid obstacles. Only the Game Start mode plays the seventh and final level in addition to the game's first six levels.

Gameplay involves being the pilot of an Apache Helicopter, and shooting enemies down in the style of a vertical scrolling shooter. Large red gunships can be shot down to gain power-ups for the helicopter in order to upgrade the guns and have it fire homing missiles. Each level features a midboss and a boss, and both must be destroyed in order to advance to the next level. The style of the levels as the player advances alternates between "Shooting Mode" and "Exploration Mode," where the latter involves levels set in a fantasy-like setting and are the only level types that provide no power-ups to the player and give the player the ability to switch their altitude.

Music
The music played at the menu is a variation of the French national anthem, La Marseillaise.
The music played at the ending credits is a variation of the Soviet Union National Anthem.

References

1991 video games
Asmik Ace Entertainment games
Helicopter video games
Vertically scrolling shooters
Super Nintendo Entertainment System games
Super Nintendo Entertainment System-only games
Video games developed in Japan
Video games set in the Middle East